is a Japanese footballer.

Career statistics

Club

Notes

References

1998 births
Living people
Sportspeople from Miyazaki Prefecture
Association football people from Miyazaki Prefecture
Japanese footballers
Japanese expatriate footballers
Association football midfielders
Singapore Premier League players
Albirex Niigata Singapore FC players
Japan Soccer College players
Japanese expatriate sportspeople in Singapore
Expatriate footballers in Singapore